The Girl is an independent film written and directed by David Riker, and starring Abbie Cornish and Will Patton. It debuted at the 2012 Tribeca Film Festival. It opened in select theaters for a one-week awards-qualifying period on December 14, 2012, and had a limited theatrical release in March 2013.

Synopsis
Cornish plays a single mother who helps illegal immigrants to cross the border from Mexico into Texas. A young Mexican girl named Rosa comes into her care.

Cast
 Abbie Cornish as "Ashley"
 Will Patton as "Tommy".
 Maritza Santiago Hernandez as "Rosa".
 Giovanna Zacarías as "Enriqueta".
 Angeles Cruz as "Rosa's Mother".	
 Raúl Castillo as "Border Agent".
 Luis Fernando Peña as "Beto".
 Isabel Cruz Daza as "Edith".	
 Ivonne Cruz Daza as "Cecilia".	
 Liliana Alberto as "Ofelia".	
 Isabel Sánchez Lara as "Rosa's Grandmother".

Reception
The Girl has received generally mixed reviews. Review aggregator Rotten Tomatoes reports that 53% of 17 critics gave the film a positive review, with an average rating of 5.2/10. Metacritic, which assigns a weighted average score from 1–100 to reviews from mainstream critics, gave the film a score of 53 based on 11 reviews indicating "mixed or average reviews".

References

External links
 Official website
 
 
 
 

2012 films
American independent films
Films shot in Texas
2010s American films